Better Mistakes is the second studio album by American singer Bebe Rexha, released on May 7, 2021, by Warner Records. It serves as the follow-up to her debut studio album, Expectations (2018) and contains guest features from Travis Barker, Ty Dolla Sign, Trevor Daniel, Lil Uzi Vert, Doja Cat, Pink Sweats, Lunay and Rick Ross. The album was preceded by the singles "Baby, I'm Jealous", "Sacrifice", and "Sabotage".

Background
Bebe worked on the album and finished it before the COVID pandemic, with most of the recording taking place in the summer and fall of 2019. Rexha announced the parent album's title as Better Mistakes, along with its artwork and release date (May 7, 2021), on April 14, 2021, along with the announcement of the third single, "Sabotage". On April 15, she revealed the tracklist on her social media accounts. The album was available for pre-order on April 16, conceding with the release of "Sabotage".

Composition 
Rexha described the album as a pop record with "a lot of hip-hop in it". She added that it's "not...dance music, but you can bop to it". The opening track, "Break My Heart Myself", which features Travis Barker, makes references to how Rexha lives with bipolar disorder.

Singles 
On October 5, 2020, Bebe Rexha announced  the lead single called "Baby, I'm Jealous", featuring Doja Cat, would be released on October 9. The song charted at number 58 on the US Billboard Hot 100. She released the follow-up single, "Sacrifice", on March 4, 2021. On April 14, Rexha announced the third single, "Sabotage", would be released on April 16, along with the album's pre-order. On April 28, Rexha announced the song "Die for a Man" featuring American rapper-singer-songwriter Lil Uzi Vert would be released as the promotional single off the album on April 30. She later gave a snippet of the song a day before the single's release.

A remix of "Break My Heart Myself" featuring Yeji and Ryujin of K-pop girl group Itzy was released as a single on July 29, 2022, following a viral dance performance of the original song by Yeji and Ryujin in June.

Critical reception

Robin Murray from Clash called the album a "bulldozer 30 minute pop experience" that "affords Bebe Rexha space to amplify her potency while exposing her insecurities", further summarizing it as "13 songs that punch out their truths and then dissipate".

Commercial performance
Better Mistakes debuted at number 140 on the US Billboard 200 becoming Rexha's lowest charting album on the chart. In Canada, the album debuted at number 57 on the Billboard Canadian Albums.

Track listing

Notes
 "Amore" contains an interpolation of the 1953 song "That's Amore", written by Harry Warren and Jack Brooks.
 "Mama" contains an interpolation of the 1975 song "Bohemian Rhapsody", by the band Queen.

Personnel
Musicians
 Bebe Rexha – lead vocals
 Travis Barker – drums 
 Peter Rycroft – bass, drums, guitar, synthesizer programming 
 David Strääf – drum programming , guitar , backing vocals, drums, synthesizer ; acoustic guitar, electric guitar, percussion, programming, violin 
 Richard Boardman – drum programming, synthesizer ; keyboards 
 Burns – all instruments 
 Pablo Bowman – backing vocals , guitar 

Technical
 Colin Leonard – masterer
 Jaycen Joshua – mixer 
 Şerban Ghenea – mixer 
 Tom Norris – mixer 
 Mitch McCarthy – mixer 
 Greg Kurstin – recording engineer 
 Alex Pasco – recording engineer 
 Julian Burg – recording engineer 
 Burns – recording engineer 
 Devon Corey – vocal engineer 
 Jon Hume – vocal engineer

Charts

Release history

References

2021 albums
Bebe Rexha albums
Albums produced by Burns (musician)
Albums produced by Greg Kurstin
Albums produced by Jason Gill (musician)
Albums produced by Jussifer
Warner Records albums